Lila Iké (Alecia Tameka Grey born 1994, Christiana) is a Jamaican reggae singer and songwriter. After releasing multiple singles, Iké released her debut studio album The ExPerience in May 2020.

Career 

Grey was born in Christiana, Manchester, Jamaica where she attended Manchester High School and graduated in 2011. She enrolled at Northern Caribbean University in Mandeville until 2015. She attempted to return to school at The University of the West Indies, but has stopped to pursue musical career.

After moving to Kingston, she began singing under the moniker Lila Music which evolved to Lila Iké based on Nigerian name Ikéchukwu, which means "power of God." In 2017 she signed with Protoje's  In.Digg.Nation label. In 2019, She toured Europe, including Rototom Sunsplash and Reggae Jam. She also opened for Protoje on his U.S. tour.

Her first album released in 2020 is called The ExPerience. Some of her singles include: "Biggest Fan," (2017), "Gotti Gotti" (2017), "Second Chance" (2018), "Where I'm Coming From" (2019), "Sweet Inspiration" (2019) and "I Spy" (2020). She is one of Jamaica's class of promising reggae artists, like Koffee and Chronixx. She appeared in  "Artist To Watch" list for BBC Radio 1Xtra's Hot for 2020.

References

Jamaican reggae singers
21st-century Jamaican women singers
People from Manchester Parish
University of the West Indies alumni
1994 births
Living people

Easy Star Records artists